Tjaša Stanko (born 5 November 1997) is a Slovenian handball player for RK Krim and the Slovenian national team.

Achievements
Slovenian First League:
Winner: 2016

Individual awards
 Best Young Player of the EHF Champions League: 2018

References

External links

1997 births
Living people
Sportspeople from Maribor
Slovenian female handball players
Mediterranean Games bronze medalists for Slovenia
Mediterranean Games medalists in handball
Competitors at the 2018 Mediterranean Games
Expatriate handball players
Slovenian expatriate sportspeople in Croatia
Slovenian expatriate sportspeople in France
RK Podravka Koprivnica players